Teeter's law is a wry observation about the biases of historical linguists, explaining how different investigators can arrive at radically divergent conceptions of the proto-language of a family:

Although the law is named after the Americanist linguist Karl Teeter, it apparently does not appear in any of Teeter's works.
It is customarily quoted from a 1976 review by the Indo-European linguist Calvert Watkins of Paul Friedrich's Proto-Indo-European syntax: the order of meaningful elements.
Watkins argued that Friedrich, after criticizing other scholars for overemphasizing particular branches of the family, had based his reconstruction of Proto-Indo-European syntax entirely on Homeric Greek.

References 

Works cited
 
 
 

Adages
Historical linguistics